Cotswold Canals may refer to:
Stroudwater Navigation
Thames and Severn Canal
Cotswold Canals Trust